Teresh may refer to

The Sea Peoples
The Tyrrhenians in particular
Teresh (biblical figure) in the Book of Esther